Khoy County is in West Azerbaijan province, Iran. The capital of the county is the city of Khoy. At the 2006 census, the county's population was 365,573 in 85,550 households. The following census in 2011 counted 354,309 people in 96,367 households, by which time Chaypareh District had been separated from the county to form Chaypareh County. At the 2016 census, Khoy County's population was 348,664 in 101,130 households.

Administrative divisions

The population history and structural changes of Khoy County's administrative divisions over three consecutive censuses are shown in the following table. The latest census shows four districts, 11 rural districts, and six cities.

History
Khoy was named in ancient times for the salt mines that made it an important spur of the Silk Route. 3000 years ago, a city had existed on the area where Khoy is located nowadays, but its name became Khoy only from 14 centuries ago. In 714 BC, Sargon II passed the region of which Khoy is part of in a campaign against Urartu.

In the Parthian period, Khoy was the gateway of the Parthian Empire in the Northwest. Around 37 BC, Marc Anthony had crossed the plain that is located between Khoy and Marand during one of the many and frequent Roman-Parthian Wars.

One of the important historic elements of the city's Khoy in the county is the St. Sourp Sarkis church, one of the many churches in the county. Armenian documents wrote that the date of the making has to be either 332 or 333 AD. In the city of Khoy and its surrounding villages, churches are seen and it is reported that Armenians have always been comprising a significant amount of the city's population, but the city was never an "Armenian city" (as in comprising a vast majority).

Modern period
Khoy city was fortified at various times in its history, most recently by the Qajar dynasty in the nineteenth century.

After the death of Nadir Shah Afshar in 1747, Khoy and its immediate surroundings broke away from central government of Iran like several other regions of Iran, including what is now Georgia and some of the northern Caucasian Khanates comprising the northwestern territories of Iran. Khoy became the centre of the newly established Khanate of Khoy (1747–1813) which was loyal to the central government only when it was powerful (like during Karim Khan's reign), and autonomous when the central role was weak. The return of Khoy to the central government of Iran was during the beginning of Qajar period during Agha Mohammad Khan's reign. Khoy was attacked in 1827 by the Russian Empire who was attempting to seize the last of the Caucasian territories of Iran comprising Armenia and what is now Azerbaijan during the Russo-Persian War (1826–1828). The war, which mainly razed in the extremely nearby South Caucasus region eventually happened to moved deeper south as well. Until 1828, Khoy had a large number of Armenians, however, the Treaty of Turkmenchay following the outcome of the 1826–1828 war and the victory over the neighbouring Ottoman Empire as concluded in the Treaty of Adrianople, encouraged the mass resettlement of Armenians from both Turkey and Iran in the Russian-controlled territory of modern Armenia. In the mid-1800s some of them immigrated to eastern Armenia, which by then had just become part of the Russian Empire. However, a small Armenian population remains living in Khoy city and county. Eli Smith notes in his "Missionary Researches in Armenia: Including a Journey through Asia Minor, an into Georgia and Persia" released in 1834 that he and his group had heard while passing through Khoy that the city had between 4000 and 7000 Muslim families, while only about 100 Armenian families were left. He noted further that in the immediate villages around Khoy city there were a few more Armenians, but the vast majority had migrated to the North of the Aras river following Russia's victory over Persia in 1828 and the encouraged settling in the newly incorporated Russian regions of Eastern Armenia.

In 1911 Khoy was occupied by Ottoman troops, followed in World War I by Russian troops, who withdrew in 1917. In World War II it was again occupied by Soviet troops, who remained until 1946. Today, Khoy County is mainly populated by both Azeris and Kurds. The Armenians and Assyrians have largely fled and left the region due to massacres before and after the First World War. Today, it has a large Kurdish and Azeri population.

Nature
Khoy is located in the mountains, so the weather is very cold in winter and cool in summer. Spring weather in this city is very pleasant. The city is located in the vicinity of mountains such as Chelekhaneh Mount and Avrin Mount (The highest mountain of West Azarbaijan Province). Khoy was fortified at various times in its history, most recently by the Qajar dynasty in the Nineteenth Century.

Transportation

Airlines and destinations
Khoy Airport  is an airport and Bus station in Khoy, Iran.

Bus terminals
A bus terminus is a designated place where a bus or coach starts or ends its scheduled route. The terminus is the designated place that a timetable is timed from. Termini can be located at bus stations, interchanges, bus garages or simple bus stops. Termini can both start and stop at the same place, or may be in different locations for starting and finishing a route. Termini may or may not coincide with the use of bus stands.

Tourism

It is well known for the tomb of Shams Tabrizi, renowned Iranian poet.

Gallery

References

 

Counties of West Azerbaijan Province